Most languages of Europe belong to the Indo-European language family. Out of a total European population of 744 million as of 2018, some 94% are native speakers of an Indo-European language. Within Indo-European, the three largest phyla in Europe are Romance, Germanic, and Slavic; they have more than 200 million speakers each and together account for close to 90% of Europeans. Smaller phyla of Indo-European found in Europe include Hellenic (Greek,  13 million), Baltic ( 7 million), Albanian ( 5 million), Celtic ( 4 million), and Armenian ( 4 million); Indo-Aryan, though a large subfamily of Indo-European, has a relatively small number of speakers in Europe (Romani,  1.5 million).

Of the approximately 45 million Europeans speaking non-Indo-European languages, most speak languages within either the Uralic or Turkic families. Still smaller groups — such as Basque (language isolate), Semitic languages (Maltese,  0.5 million), and various languages of the Caucasus — account for less than 1% of the European population between them. Immigration has added sizeable communities of speakers of African and Asian languages, amounting to about 4% of the population, with Arabic being the most widely spoken of them.

Five languages have more than 50 million native speakers in Europe: Russian, French, Italian, German, and English. Russian is the most-spoken native language in Europe, and English has the largest number of speakers in total, including some 200 million speakers of English as a second or foreign language. (See English language in Europe.)

Indo-European languages 

The Indo-European language family is descended from Proto-Indo-European, which is believed to have been spoken thousands of years ago. Early speakers of Indo-European daughter languages most likely expanded into Europe with the incipient Bronze Age, around 4,000 years ago (Bell-Beaker culture).

Germanic 

The Germanic languages make up the predominant language family in Western, Northern and Central Europe. An estimated 210 million Europeans are native speakers of Germanic languages, the largest groups being German ( 95 million), English ( 70 million), Dutch ( 24 million), Swedish ( 10 million), Danish ( 6 million), Norwegian ( 5 million) and Limburgish (c. 1.3 million).

There are two extant major sub-divisions: West Germanic and North Germanic. A third group, East Germanic, is now extinct; the only known surviving East Germanic texts are written in the Gothic language. West Germanic is divided into Anglo-Frisian (including English), Low German, Low Franconian (including Dutch) and High German (including Standard German).

Anglo-Frisian

The Anglo-Frisian language family is now mostly represented by English (Anglic), descended from the Old English language spoken by the Anglo-Saxons:

 English, the main language of the United Kingdom and the most widespread language in the Republic of Ireland, also spoken as a second or third language by many Europeans.
 Scots, spoken in Scotland and Ulster, recognized by some as a language and by others as a dialect of English.
The Frisian languages are spoken by about 500,000 Frisians, who live on the southern coast of the North Sea in the Netherlands and Germany. These languages include West Frisian, East Frisian (only surviving dialect of it is Saterlandic) and North Frisian.

Dutch

Dutch is spoken throughout the Netherlands, the northern half of Belgium, as well as the Nord-Pas de Calais region of France. The traditional dialects of the Lower Rhine region of Germany, are linguistically more closely related to Dutch than to modern German. In Belgian and French contexts, Dutch is sometimes referred to as Flemish. Dutch dialects are varied and cut across national borders.

German

German is spoken throughout Germany, Austria, Liechtenstein, much of Switzerland (including the northeast areas bordering on Germany and Austria), northern Italy (South Tyrol), Luxembourg, the East Cantons of Belgium and the Alsace and Lorraine regions of France.

There are several groups of German dialects:

 High German includes several dialect families:
 Standard German
 Central German dialects, spoken in central Germany and including Luxembourgish
 High Franconian, a family of transitional dialects between Central and Upper High German
 Upper German, including Bavarian and Swiss German
 Yiddish is a set of two Jewish languages developed in Germany and later Eastern Europe. They share many features of High German dialects and Hebrew.
 Low German (or Low Saxon) is spoken in various regions throughout Northern Germany and the northern and eastern parts of the Netherlands. It is an official language in Germany. It may be separated into West Low German and East Low German.

North Germanic (Scandinavian)
The North Germanic languages are spoken in Scandinavian countries and include Danish (Denmark), Norwegian (Norway), Swedish (Sweden and parts of Finland), or Elfdalian (in a small part of central Sweden), Faroese (Faroe Islands), and Icelandic (Iceland).

English has a long history of contact with Scandinavian languages, given the immigration of Scandinavians early in the history of Britain, and shares various features with the Scandinavian languages. Even so, especially Swedish, but also Danish and Norwegian, have strong vocabulary connections to the German language.

Limburgish
Limburgish (also called Limburgan, Limburgian, or Limburgic) Is a west Germanic language spoken in the province of Limburg in the Netherlands, Belgium and neighboring regions of Germany

Romance 

Roughly 215 million Europeans (primarily in Southern and Western Europe) are native speakers of Romance languages, the largest groups including:

French ( 72 million),
Italian ( 65 million),
Spanish ( 40 million), 
Romanian ( 24 million),
Portuguese ( 10 million),
Catalan ( 7 million),
Sicilian ( 5 million, also subsumed under Italian), 
Venetian ( 4 million),
Galician ( 2 million),
Sardinian ( 1 million),
Occitan ( 500,000), besides numerous smaller communities.

The Romance languages evolved from varieties of Vulgar Latin spoken in the various parts of the Roman Empire in Late Antiquity. Latin was itself part of the (otherwise extinct) Italic branch of Indo-European.
Romance languages are divided phylogenetically into Italo-Western, Eastern Romance (including Romanian) and Sardinian. The Romance-speaking area of Europe is occasionally referred to as Latin Europe.

We can further break down Italo-Western into the Italo-Dalmatian languages (sometimes grouped with Eastern Romance), including the Tuscan-derived Italian and numerous local Romance languages in Italy as well as Dalmatian, and the Western Romance languages. The Western Romance languages in turn separate into the Gallo-Romance languages, including Langues d'oïl such as French, the Francoprovencalic languages Arpitan and Faetar, the Rhaeto-Romance languages, and the Gallo-Italic languages; the Occitano-Romance languages, grouped with either Gallo-Romance or East Iberian, including Occitanic languages such as Occitan and Gardiol, and Catalan; Aragonese, grouped in with either Occitano-Romance or West Iberian, and finally the West Iberian languages, including the Astur-Leonese languages, the Galician-Portuguese languages, and the Castilian languages.

Slavic 

Slavic languages are spoken in large areas of Southern, Central and Eastern Europe. An estimated 250 million Europeans are native speakers of Slavic languages, the largest groups being 
Russian ( 110 million in European Russia and adjacent parts of Eastern Europe, Russian forming the largest linguistic community in Europe),
Polish ( 45 million),
Ukrainian ( 40 million), 
Serbo-Croatian ( 21 million),
Czech ( 11 million),
Bulgarian ( 9 million), 
Slovak ( 5 million)
Belarusian and Slovene ( 3 million each)
and Macedonian ( 2 million).

Phylogenetically, Slavic is divided into three subgroups:

 West Slavic includes Polish, Czech, Slovak, Lower Sorbian, Upper Sorbian, Silesian and Kashubian.
 East Slavic includes Russian, Ukrainian, Belarusian, and Rusyn.
 South Slavic includes Slovene and Serbo-Croatian in the southwest and Bulgarian, Macedonian and Church Slavonic (a liturgical language) in the southeast, each with numerous distinctive dialects. South Slavic languages constitute a dialect continuum where standard Slovene, Macedonian and Bulgarian are each based on a distinct dialect, whereas pluricentric Serbo-Croatian boasts four mutually intelligible national standard varieties all based on a single dialect, Shtokavian.

Others 
 Greek ( 13 million) is the official language of Greece and Cyprus, and there are Greek-speaking enclaves in Albania, Bulgaria, Italy, North Macedonia, Romania, Georgia, Ukraine, Lebanon, Egypt, Israel, Jordan, and Turkey, and in Greek communities around the world. Dialects of modern Greek that originate from Attic Greek (through Koine and then Medieval Greek) are Cappadocian, Pontic, Cretan, Cypriot, Katharevousa, and Yevanic.
 Italiot Greek is, debatably, a Doric dialect of Greek. It is spoken in southern Italy only, in the southern Calabria region (as Grecanic) and in the Salento region (as Griko). It was studied by the German linguist Gerhard Rohlfs during the 1930s and 1950s.
 Tsakonian is a Doric dialect of the Greek language spoken in the lower Arcadia region of the Peloponnese around the village of Leonidio
 

 The Baltic languages are spoken in Lithuania (Lithuanian ( 3 million), Samogitian) and Latvia (Latvian ( 2 million), Latgalian). Samogitian and Latgalian used to be considered dialects of Lithuanian and Latvian respectively.
 There are also several extinct Baltic languages, including: Galindian, Curonian, Old Prussian, Selonian, Semigallian and Sudovian.
 Albanian ( 5 million) has two major dialects, Tosk Albanian and Gheg Albanian. It is spoken in Albania and Kosovo, neighboring North Macedonia, Serbia, Greece, Italy, and Montenegro. It is also widely spoken in the Albanian diaspora.
 Armenian ( 7 million) has two major forms, Western Armenian and Eastern Armenian. It is spoken in Armenia, Artsakh and Georgia (Samtskhe-Javakheti), also Russia, France, Italy, Turkey,  Greece, and Cyprus. It is also widely spoken in the Armenian Diaspora. 
 There are six living Celtic languages, spoken in areas of northwestern Europe dubbed the "Celtic nations". All six are members of the Insular Celtic family, which in turn is divided into:
 Brittonic family: Welsh (Wales,  700,000), Cornish (Cornwall,  500) and Breton (Brittany,  200,000)
 Goidelic family: Irish (Ireland,  2,000,000), Scottish Gaelic (Scotland,  50,000), and Manx (Isle of Man, 1,800)
 Continental Celtic languages had previously been spoken across Europe from Iberia and Gaul to Asia Minor, but became extinct in the first millennium AD.
 The Indo-Aryan languages have one major representation: Romani ( 1.5 million speakers), introduced in Europe during the late medieval period. Lacking a nation state, Romani is spoken as a minority language throughout Europe.
 The Iranian languages in Europe are natively represented in the North Caucasus, notably with Ossetian ( 600,000).

Non-Indo-European languages

Turkic 

 Oghuz languages in Europe include Turkish, spoken in East Thrace and by immigrant communities; Azerbaijani is spoken in Northeast Azerbaijan and parts of Southern Russia and Gagauz is spoken in Gagauzia.
 Kipchak languages in Europe include Karaim, Crimean Tatar and Krymchak, which is spoken in mainly Crimea; Tatar, which is spoken in Tatarstan; Bashkir, which is spoken in Bashkortostan; Karachay-Balkar, which is spoken in the North Caucasus, and Kazakh, which is spoken in Northwest Kazakhstan.
 Oghur languages were historically indigenous to much of Eastern Europe; however, most of them are extinct today, with the exception of Chuvash, which is spoken in Chuvashia.

Uralic 

Uralic is native to northern Eurasia. Finno-Ugric groups the Uralic languages other than Samoyedic.
Finnic languages include Finnish ( 5 million), Estonian ( 1 million), Mari (c. 400,000) and Kven ( 8,000). The Sami languages ( 30,000) are closely related to Finnic.

The Ugric languages are represented in Europe with the Hungarian language ( 13 million), historically introduced with the Hungarian conquest of the Carpathian Basin of the 9th century.
The Samoyedic Nenets language is spoken in Nenets Autonomous Okrug of Russia, located in the far northeastern corner of Europe (as delimited by the Ural Mountains).

Others 
 The Basque language (or Euskara,  750,000) is a language isolate and the ancestral language of the Basque people who inhabit the Basque Country, a region in the western Pyrenees mountains mostly in northeastern Spain and partly in southwestern France of about 3 million inhabitants, where it is spoken fluently by about 750,000 and understood by more than 1.5 million people. Basque is directly related to ancient Aquitanian, and it is likely that an early form of the Basque language was present in Western Europe before the arrival of the Indo-European languages in the area in the Bronze Age.
 North Caucasian languages is a geographical blanket term for two unrelated language families spoken chiefly in the north Caucasus and Turkey—the Northwest Caucasian family (including Abkhaz and Circassian) and the Northeast Caucasian family, spoken mainly in the border area of the southern Russian Federation (including Dagestan, Chechnya, and Ingushetia).
 Kalmyk is a Mongolic language, spoken in the Republic of Kalmykia, part of the Russian Federation. Its speakers entered the Volga region in the early 17th century.
 Kartvelian languages (also known as Southwest Caucasian languages), the most common of which is Georgian ( 3.5 million), others being Mingrelian and Svan, spoken mainly in the Caucasus and Anatolia.
 Maltese ( 500,000) is a Semitic language with Romance and Germanic influences, spoken in Malta. It is based on Sicilian Arabic, with influences from Sicilian, Italian, French and, more recently, English. It is unique in that it is the only Semitic language whose standard form is written in Latin script. It is also the second smallest official language of the EU in terms of speakers (after Irish), and the only official Semitic language within the EU.
 Cypriot Maronite Arabic (also known as Cypriot Arabic) is a variety of Arabic spoken by Maronites in Cyprus. Most speakers live in Nicosia, but others are in the communities of Kormakiti and Lemesos. Brought to the island by Maronites fleeing Lebanon over 700 years ago, this variety of Arabic has been influenced by Greek in both phonology and vocabulary, while retaining certain unusually archaic features in other respects. Dialects of Eastern Aramaic are spoken by Assyrian communities in the Caucasus and southern Russia who fled the Assyrian Genocide during World War I.

Sign languages

Several dozen manual languages exist across Europe, with the most widespread sign language family being the Francosign languages, with its languages found in countries from Iberia to the Balkans and the Baltics. Accurate historical information of sign and tactile languages is difficult to come by, with folk histories noting the existence signing communities across Europe hundreds of years ago. British Sign Language (BSL) and French Sign Language (LSF) are probably the oldest confirmed, continuously used sign languages. Alongside German Sign Language (DGS) according to Ethnologue, these three have the most numbers of signers, though very few institutions take appropriate statistics on contemporary signing populations, making legitimate data hard to find.

Notably, few European sign languages have overt connections with the local majority/oral languages, aside from standard language contact and borrowing, meaning grammatically the sign languages and the oral languages of Europe are quite distinct from one another. Due to (visual/aural) modality differences, most sign languages are named for the larger ethnic nation in which they are spoken, plus the words "sign language", rendering what is spoken across much of France, Wallonia and Romandy as French Sign Language or LSF for: langue des signes française.

Recognition of non-oral languages varies widely from region to region. Some countries afford legal recognition, even to official on a state level, whereas others continue to be actively suppressed.

The major sign linguistic families are:

 Francosign languages, such as LSF, Irish SL, Austrian Sign Language (ÖGS), Eesti Viipekeel, and probably both Catalan and Valencian Sign Languages.
 Danish Sign languages, such as DTS, Icelandic Taknmal, Faroese Taknmal, and NTS.
 Austro-Hungarian Sign descendants, including the sub-families descended from both (separately) the Yugoslav Sign Language and Russian Sign Language, such as Macedonian Sign Language and HZJ, or LGK and Ukrainian Sign Language (USL).
 Banzsl languages, such as BSL and Northern Ireland Sign Language (NISL).
 Swedish Sign family, such as SSL, Viittomakieli, FinnSSL, and Portuguese Sign Language (LGP), all of which may be descended from Old BSL.
 Germanosign languages, such as DGS and Polish Sign Language (PJM).
 Isolate languages, such as Albanian Sign Language, Armenian Sign Language, Caucasian Sign Language, Spanish Sign Language (LSE), Turkish Sign Language (TİD), and perhaps Ghardaia Sign Language.

History of standardization

Language and identity, standardization processes 
In the Middle Ages the two most important defining elements of Europe were Christianitas and Latinitas.

The earliest dictionaries were glossaries: more or less structured lists of lexical pairs (in alphabetical order or according to conceptual fields). The Latin-German (Latin-Bavarian) Abrogans was among the first. A new wave of lexicography can be seen from the late 15th century onwards (after the introduction of the printing press, with the growing interest in standardisation of languages).

The concept of the nation state began to emerge in the early modern period. Nations adopted particular dialects as their national language. This, together with improved communications, led to official efforts to standardise the national language, and a number of language academies were established: 1582 Accademia della Crusca in Florence, 1617 Fruchtbringende Gesellschaft in Weimar, 1635 Académie française in Paris, 1713 Real Academia Española in Madrid. Language became increasingly linked to nation as opposed to culture, and was also used to promote religious and ethnic identity: e.g. different Bible translations in the same language for Catholics and Protestants.

The first languages whose standardisation was promoted included Italian (questione della lingua: Modern Tuscan/Florentine vs. Old Tuscan/Florentine vs. Venetian → Modern Florentine + archaic Tuscan + Upper Italian), French (the standard is based on Parisian), English (the standard is based on the London dialect) and (High) German (based on the dialects of the chancellery of Meissen in Saxony, Middle German, and the chancellery of Prague in Bohemia ("Common German")). But several other nations also began to develop a standard variety in the 16th century.

Lingua franca 
Europe has had a number of languages that were considered linguae francae over some ranges for some periods according to some historians. Typically in the rise of a national language the new language becomes a lingua franca to peoples in the range of the future nation until the consolidation and unification phases. If the nation becomes internationally influential, its language may become a lingua franca among nations that speak their own national languages. Europe has had no lingua franca ranging over its entire territory spoken by all or most of its populations during any historical period. Some linguae francae of past and present over some of its regions for some of its populations are:

 Classical Greek and then Koine Greek in the Mediterranean Basin from the Athenian Empire to the Eastern Roman Empire, being replaced by Modern Greek.
 Koine Greek and Modern Greek, in the Eastern Roman or Byzantine Empire and other parts of the Balkans south of the Jireček Line.
 Vulgar Latin and Late Latin among the uneducated and educated populations respectively of the Roman Empire and the states that followed it in the same range no later than 900 AD; Medieval Latin and Renaissance Latin among the educated populations of western, northern, central and part of eastern Europe until the rise of the national languages in that range, beginning with the first language academy in Italy in 1582/83; new Latin written only in scholarly and scientific contexts by a small minority of the educated population at scattered locations over all of Europe; ecclesiastical Latin, in spoken and written contexts of liturgy and church administration only, over the range of the Roman Catholic Church.
 Lingua Franca or Sabir, the original of the name, an Italian-based pidgin language of mixed origins used by maritime commercial interests around the Mediterranean in the Middle Ages and early Modern Age.
 Old French in continental western European countries and in the Crusader states.
 Czech, mainly during the reign of Holy Roman Emperor Charles IV (14th century) but also during other periods of Bohemian control over the Holy Roman Empire.
 Middle Low German, around the 14th–16th century, during the heyday of the Hanseatic League, mainly in Northeastern Europe across the Baltic Sea.
 Spanish as Castilian in Spain and New Spain from the times of the Catholic Monarchs and Columbus, c. 1492; that is, after the Reconquista, until established as a national language in the times of Louis XIV, c. 1648; subsequently multinational in all nations in or formerly in the Spanish Empire.
 Polish, due to the Polish–Lithuanian Commonwealth (16th–18th centuries).
 Italian due to the Renaissance, the opera, the Italian Empire, the fashion industry and the influence of the Roman Catholic church.
 French from the golden age under Cardinal Richelieu and Louis XIV c. 1648; i.e., after the Thirty Years' War, in France and the French colonial empire, until established as the national language during the French Revolution of 1789 and subsequently multinational in all nations in or formerly in the various French Empires.
 German in Northern, Central, and Eastern Europe.
 English in Great Britain until its consolidation as a national language in the Renaissance and the rise of Modern English; subsequently internationally under the various states in or formerly in the British Empire; globally since the victories of the predominantly English speaking countries (United States, United Kingdom, Canada, Australia, New Zealand, and others) and their allies in the two world wars ending in 1918 (World War I) and 1945 (World War II) and the subsequent rise of the United States as a superpower and major cultural influence.
 Russian in the former Soviet Union and Russian Empire including Northern and Central Asia.

Linguistic minorities 
Historical attitudes towards linguistic diversity are illustrated by two French laws: the Ordonnance de Villers-Cotterêts (1539), which said that every document in France should be written in French (neither in Latin nor in Occitan) and the Loi Toubon (1994), which aimed to eliminate anglicisms from official documents. States and populations within a state have often resorted to war to settle their differences. There have been attempts to prevent such hostilities: two such initiatives were promoted by the Council of Europe, founded in 1949, which affirms the right of minority language speakers to use their language fully and freely. The Council of Europe is committed to protecting linguistic diversity. Currently all European countries except France, Andorra and Turkey have signed the Framework Convention for the Protection of National Minorities, while Greece, Iceland and Luxembourg have signed it, but have not ratified it; this framework entered into force in 1998. Another European treaty, the European Charter for Regional or Minority Languages, was adopted in 1992 under the auspices of the Council of Europe: it entered into force in 1998, and while it is legally binding for 24 countries, France, Iceland, Italy, North Macedonia, Moldova and Russia have chosen to sign without ratifying the convention.

Scripts 

The main scripts used in Europe today are the Latin and Cyrillic.

The Greek alphabet was derived from the Phoenician alphabet, and Latin was derived from the Greek via the Old Italic alphabet. In the Early Middle Ages, Ogham was used in Ireland and runes (derived from Old Italic script) in Scandinavia. Both were replaced in general use by the Latin alphabet by the Late Middle Ages. The Cyrillic script was derived from the Greek with the first texts appearing around 940 AD.

Around 1900 there were mainly two typeface variants of the Latin alphabet used in Europe: Antiqua and Fraktur. Fraktur was used most for German, Estonian, Latvian, Norwegian and Danish whereas Antiqua was used for Italian, Spanish, French, Polish, Portuguese, English, Romanian, Swedish and Finnish. The Fraktur variant was banned by Hitler in 1941, having been described as "Schwabacher Jewish letters". Other scripts have historically been in use in Europe, including Phoenician, from which modern Latin letters descend, Ancient Egyptian hieroglyphs on Egyptian artefacts traded during Antiquity, various runic systems used in Northern Europe preceding Christianisation, and Arabic during the era of the Ottoman Empire.

Hungarian rovás was used by the Hungarian people in the early Middle Ages, but it was gradually replaced with the Latin-based Hungarian alphabet when Hungary became a kingdom, though it was revived in the 20th century and has certain marginal, but growing area of usage since then.

European Union 

The European Union (as of 2021) had 27 member states accounting for a population of 447 million, or about 60% of the population of Europe.

The European Union has designated by agreement with the member states 24 languages as "official and working": Bulgarian, Croatian, Czech, Danish, Dutch, English, Estonian, Finnish, French, German, Greek, Hungarian, Irish, Italian, Latvian, Lithuanian, Maltese, Polish, Portuguese, Romanian, Slovak, Slovenian, Spanish and Swedish. This designation provides member states with two "entitlements": the member state may communicate with the EU in any of the designated languages, and view "EU regulations and other legislative documents" in that language.

The European Union and the Council of Europe have been collaborating in education of member populations in languages for "the promotion of plurilingualism" among EU member states. The joint document, "Common European Framework of Reference for Languages: Learning, Teaching, Assessment (CEFR)", is an educational standard defining "the competencies necessary for communication" and related knowledge for the benefit of educators in setting up educational programs. 
In a 2005 independent survey requested by the EU's Directorate-General for Education and Culture regarding the extent to which major European languages were spoken in member states. The results were published in a 2006 document, "Europeans and Their Languages", or "Eurobarometer 243". In this study, statistically relevant samples of the population in each country were asked to fill out a survey form concerning the languages that they spoke with sufficient competency "to be able to have a conversation".

List of languages 

The following is a table of European languages. The number of speakers as a first or second language (L1 and L2 speakers) listed are speakers in Europe only; see list of languages by number of native speakers and list of languages by total number of speakers for global estimates on numbers of speakers.

The list is intended to include any language variety with an ISO 639 code. However, it omits sign languages. Because the ISO-639-2 and ISO-639-3 codes have different definitions, this means that some communities of speakers may be listed more than once. For instance, speakers of Bavarian are listed both under "Bavarian" (ISO-639-3 code bar) as well as under "German" (ISO-639-2 code de).

Languages spoken in Armenia, Azerbaijan, Cyprus, Georgia, and Turkey 
There are various definitions of Europe, which may or may not include all or parts of Turkey, Cyprus, Armenia, Azerbaijan, and Georgia. For convenience, the languages and associated statistics for all five of these countries are grouped together on this page, as they are usually presented at a national, rather than subnational, level.

Immigrant communities
Recent (post–1945) immigration to Europe introduced substantial communities of speakers of non-European languages.

The largest such communities include Arabic speakers  (see Arabs in Europe)
and Turkish speakers (beyond European Turkey and the historical sphere of influence of the Ottoman Empire, see Turks in Europe).
Armenians, Berbers, and Kurds have diaspora communities of  1–2,000,000 each. The various languages of Africa and languages of India form numerous smaller diaspora communities.

List of the largest immigrant languages

See also 

 Ethnic groups in Europe
 Eurolinguistics
 European Day of Languages
 Greek East and Latin West
 List of endangered languages in Europe
 List of multilingual countries and regions of Europe
 Standard Average European
 Travellingua

Notes

References

External links 

 
 
 
 Map of Minorities & Regional and Minority Languages of Europe, Language Diversity (2017)